Felsőgagy is a village in Borsod-Abaúj-Zemplén County in northeastern Hungary. , the town had a population of 161.

References

Populated places in Borsod-Abaúj-Zemplén County